Ana Auther (born September 29, 1959) is an American actress. She played Dr. Luisa Estrada in NBC's soap opera Sunset Beach.

Filmography

Film

Television

References

External links

Living people
American soap opera actresses
American television actresses
1959 births
21st-century American women
Place of birth missing (living people)